West Fork Deep River is a  long 3rd order tributary to the Deep River in Guilford County, North Carolina.  This stream along the East Fork Deep River forms the Deep River.

Course
West Fork Deep River rises in Kernersville, North Carolina in Forsyth County and then flows southeast into Guilford County to join East Fork Deep River forming the Deep River within High Point Lake.

Watershed
West Fork Deep River drains  of area, receives about 45.5 in/year of precipitation, and has a wetness index of 433.75 and is about 22% forested.

References

Rivers of North Carolina
Rivers of Forsyth County, North Carolina
Rivers of Guilford County, North Carolina